Redstart is a name used for a number of songbirds that are not closely related to each other:

Old world flycatcher family (Muscicapidae)

 Phoenicurus, 14 species found in Africa, Asia and Europe
 Common redstart, a European species often known simply as "redstart"
  White-bellied redstart, an Asian species not closely related to the Phoenicurus redstarts

New world warbler family (Parulidae)

 Myioborus, 12 species found in North and South America, also known as "whitestarts"
 American redstart, a species found in North and South America, not closely related to the genus Myioborus

Bird common names